The International Composers Festival is a regular event comprising a series of concerts, lectures and networking opportunities created with the purpose to  promote and showcase classical music that is tuneful, universally appealing and created solely by living composers attending the concerts.
The festival was founded in 2012 by composer, concert pianist and artistic director Polo Piatti   and the festival patrons are composers Nigel Hess and Debbie Wiseman OBE. 
The first festival took place on 24th-25th August 2012 and subsequent festivals took place in 2013, 2015 and 2018 always in Hastings and Bexhill-on-Sea, East Sussex, UK. 
The repertoire encompasses works especially selected from submissions from all over the world and includes big orchestral compositions, film scores, computer gaming music, televisions themes, chamber and dance music usually performed in six concerts over a long weekend.

A strong element in the festival is the opportunity for composers from different parts of the world to come together and network with colleagues and organisations in the United Kingdom.
Principal festival conductors include Stephen Ellery (Wales), Derek Carden (UK), Irish Endo (Japan) and John Andrews (UK) and composers in residence include Simon Proctor, Nobuya Monta, Ash Madni. The current composer in residence is Paul Lewis and youth ambassador is Oliver Poole.

2018 Festival
In addition to the Composers in residence, the 2018 festival included;
 Antonio D'Antò - Italy
 Matthew Curtis - United Kingdom
 Sergio Puccini
 Carlos Salomon
 Dominik Scherrer

References

External links
International Composers Festival website

Classical music festivals in the United Kingdom